The four nation bandy tournament in 2014 was held as a centenary celebration of the 1913 European Bandy Championships.

On 6 January 2014 the Federation of International Bandy together with the Federation of Swiss Bandy arranged a four nation tournament in Davos to celebrate the anniversary of the 1913 European Championship. Czech Republic, Germany, Hungary and Netherlands played at the same venue as 101 years ago. The Dutch won this unofficial European Championship.

This tournament got a follow-up with the Davos Cup in 2016.

Games

Results table

Sources

International bandy competitions
Bandy competitions in Europe
2014 in bandy
2014 in Swiss sport
International bandy competitions hosted by Switzerland